Michael Soboff (born December 9, 1989) is an Armenian soccer player who most recently played for Wilmington Hammerheads in the USL.

Career

Soboff began his career in Armenia with FC Pyunik in 2010 after playing with the national side's under-19 squad. After returning to the United States, Soboff played college soccer at Rutgers University and Brandeis University. He also played with Premier Development League side Worcester Hydra in 2012.

After graduating from Brandeis, Soboff signed with Liga Alef side Hakoah Amidar Ramat Gan. He returned to the States in June 2016, when he signed with United Soccer League side Wilmington Hammerheads.

References

External links

1989 births
Living people
American people of Jewish descent
People from Boston
American soccer players
Armenian footballers
Rutgers Scarlet Knights men's soccer players
FC Pyunik players
Worcester Hydra players
Hakoah Maccabi Amidar Ramat Gan F.C. players
Wilmington Hammerheads FC players
Association football defenders
Soccer players from Massachusetts
USL Championship players
American people of Armenian descent
Citizens of Armenia through descent
American emigrants to Israel